was a  after Kanshō and before Ōnin. The period spanned the years February 1466 through March 1467.

Change of era
 1466 : The era name was changed to mark an event or a number of events. The old era ended and a new one commenced in Kanshō 7.

Events of the Bunshō era
 1466 (Bunshō 1, 1st month): Dainagon Ashikaga Yoshimi, brother of the shōgun Ashikaga Yoshimasa, was promoted to the second rank of the second class in the Imperial court hierarchy.
 1466 (Bunshō 1, 1st month): Minamoto-no Mitsihisa was replaced as udaijin by dainagon Fuijwara no Matsatsugu.

Notes

References
 Nussbaum, Louis Frédéric and Käthe Roth. (2005). Japan Encyclopedia. Cambridge: Harvard University Press. ; OCLC 48943301
 Titsingh, Isaac. (1834). Nihon Ōdai Ichiran; ou,  Annales des empereurs du Japon.  Paris: Royal Asiatic Society, Oriental Translation Fund of Great Britain and Ireland. OCLC 5850691

External links
 National Diet Library, "The Japanese Calendar" – historical overview plus illustrative images from library's collection

Japanese eras
1460s in Japan